Oscar Esperanza Palavecino (Palaviccini) (born in the ranch El Ñato, Departamento Rivadavia, Salta, 1959-12-18) is an Argentine folklore singer, also known as El Chaqueño Palavecino.

Childhood 
He was born on December 18, 1959, in the town of "Rancho El Ñato" in the department of Rivadavia, in the Chaco region of the province of Salta. Since he was a child he worked to be able to collaborate at home. At the age of 9, his mother Estela fell ill, which is why, three years later, they had to sell their few belongings and settle in Tartagal with their mother and their brothers Pascual, Juan Pablo and Lucho. They lived in his uncle's house for a long time 2 In the morning he attended classes and in the afternoon he worked. He worked multiple jobs during those years, working until 2 in the morning with his brother.

At the age of 16, his mother died and Oscar stopped living with his brothers since the three of them were going to work in the province of Salta, but before that his brother Juan Pablo took him to live in the city of Salta in the house of an aunt, and there he dedicated himself to selling gas cylinders. In 1979 he did his mandatory military service in Córdoba and on his return to Salta he became a truck driver for the same company where he had previously sold jugs. At the age of 24 he returned to live in Tartagal and began working as a bus driver. of short and long distance in the company Atahualpa, crossing routes of Vespucio, Pocitos, Orán and Salta until arriving at Buenos Aires. During this time his interest in music began, having to share his passion for singing along with work.

Musical career 
beginnings in music

Little by little his first steps as a singer began, he began to appear in the folk club "Gauchos de Güemes" and in the barbecue of "Don Johnny". In this way he began to get through his fear of the public.

When he was 25 years old he formed his first group: Pilcomayo Tres. They formed him in "El Negro" Gómez on violin, Elvio Condoríen on guitar and Oscar on bass drum. With the group he toured the north, where he was very well received, but shortly after the violinist left, the group split up. Planning to put together his next group, Oscar summoned Oscar Bazán on lead guitar, Don Lucas Cabral on bandoneon, Elías Balderrama on second guitar and Pascual Toledo on percussion, the latter being succeeded by Dante Catán and Dante Delgadillo, who they were percussionists for a short time.

He recorded his first cassette with the participation of Mauro Matos, a violinist from the City of Buenos Aires. Due to the cost that the recording session represented, Oscar had to ask for help from people close to him to pay for the production. Unfortunately, he did not achieve his goal, leaving the recording incomplete. One of his outstanding songs that he composed at this time was "Gatito pa' don Lucas".

For my grandparents there is Zamba and «The law and the trap» 
Finally, in 1987, he completed the production of his first cassette entitled "Pa' mis Abuelos esta Zamba". Oscar was always grateful to the people who somehow gave him a hand back then, among them; Los Chalchaleros, Luis Landriscina, Raúl Portal and Mabel Maharbiz, among others.

He began to tour the folklore stages with his group until he returned to the stage that saw him born in the Peña de los Gauchos de Güemes where success led him to record his second cassette, "Pa'l Tío Pala" in 1989. This work had more successful than before.

His participation in the 1992 Preserenata led him to the Serenata Mayor; there Oscar performed with Don Lucas Cabral on the bandoneon, Pascual Toledo on the bass drum, el Mulato and Oscar Bazán.

In 1993 he left Tartagal and the company where he worked for 11 years. Already settled in Salta, he began working at the passenger transport company La Veloz del Norte. In the years 1994 and 1995 he made an effort to maintain his work and his singing. In 1995 he recorded El alma de Felipito.

In 2001 he released his best-known song: "La ley y la trap", which was part of the homonymous album.

In 2004 he appeared at Luna Park showing his new studio album along with the artist's collected hits, this presentation would result in the album En vivo - Buenos Aires released in 2005. A year later he released 2 CDs, El Chaqueño Palavecino y sus friends and the pleasure is mine.

Embracing the caudillo and musical consecration 
In 2008, the Chaqueño Palavecino presented "Embracing the caudillo", which brings together 21 songs belonging to the renowned Argentine composer Horacio Guaraný. Through a few words as an introduction, Guaraný participated in Palavecino's album, who performs the repertoire of folk songs.

In 2009 he toured Argentina with Los Nocheros and Soledad, in an event entitled "La Fiesta", which produced the CD and DVD of the same name, recorded on May 16 of that year at the Vélez Sarsfield stadium in Buenos Aires. Natalia Pastorutti participated as guests in the song "Jamás" and Los Tekis in "Qué no Daría".

In 2010 he celebrated a quarter of a century with music, releasing his new album "25 years", a year later, in 2011, the Chaqueño Palavecino recorded the album "Mi Cielo Terrenal", composed of 14 songs. In 2012, his friend and lead guitarist of his group, Oscar "El Chato" Bazán, died of lymphatic cancer.

In 2017 he released "33, foul envido and trick" in a total of 3 CDs. In 2019 he released Soy y Seré, a studio album with two sides, Side A with six songs and Side B with six more. It was presented at Teatro Gran Rex with two consecutive dates on December 20 and 21.

In September 2020 he contracted COVID-19.

Discography
 Pa' mis abuelos esta zamba
 Pa'l tío Pala
 El Alma de Filipito
 Salteño Viejo
 Apenas Cantor
 Por culpa de ser Cantor
 La estampa de Cantor
 Chaqueñadas
 La Ley y La Trampa
 La Pura Verdad
 Juan de la Calle 
 El gusto es mio
 Chaco Escondido
 25 Años album

References
https://es.wikipedia.org/wiki/Chaque%C3%B1o_Palavecino

External links
 Official site

1959 births
Living people
People from Salta Province
Argentine folk singers
20th-century Argentine male singers